Below is a list of the forms of Slavic nationalism.

Pan-Slavism
Slavophile
Neo-Slavism
Austro-Slavism
East Slavic
Russian nationalism/ Greater Russia
Russophilia
Ukrainian nationalism/ Greater Ukraine/ Little Russian identity
West Slavic,
Czech nationalism
Czechoslovakism
Slovak nationalism
Polish nationalism
South Slavic, see rise of nationalism under the Ottoman Empire
Bosniak nationalism
Croatian nationalism/ Greater Croatia/ Illyrian movement
Macedonian nationalism/ United Macedonia
Montenegrin nationalism
Serbian nationalism/ Greater Serbia
Serbian–Montenegrin unionism
Slovenian nationalism/ United Slovenia/ Venetic theory
Bulgarian nationalism/ Greater Bulgaria
Yugoslavism/ Yugoslav irredentism/ Balkan Federation

See also
 Croatian nationalism (disambiguation)
 Serbian nationalism (disambiguation)